Disney's Mulan is a 1998 action video game based on the Disney film Mulan, and released on the Game Boy. It is a part of the Mulan franchise. The action game is published by THQ and developed by Tiertex Design Studios. It was released on 16 October 1998, two days before the release of Game Boy Color.

References 

1998 video games
Action video games
Mulan (franchise)
Game Boy games
THQ games
Tiertex Design Studios games
Game Boy-only games
Video games developed in the United Kingdom
Video games set in the Han dynasty